The 2020 Olympic Wrestling Pan American Qualification Tournament was the first regional qualifying tournament for the 2020 Summer Olympics. The event was held from 13 to 15 March 2020, in Ottawa, Canada.

Qualification summary 
A total of 36 athletes secured a spot in the 2020 Summer Olympics, in Tokyo. Two spots were given to each of the weight classes. This allows a total of 12 available spots for each event. Every winner and runner-up per class were awarded their place for wrestling, at the 2020 Summer Olympics. Quota places are allocated to the respective NOC and not to competitor that achieved the place in the qualification event.

Men's freestyle

57 kg
15 March

65 kg
15 March

74 kg
15 March

86 kg
15 March

 Angus Arthur of Jamaica originally finished 5th, but was later disqualified for doping.

97 kg
15 March

125 kg
15 March

Men's Greco-Roman

60 kg
13 March

67 kg
13 March

77 kg
13 March

87 kg
13 March

97 kg
13 March

130 kg
13 March

Women's freestyle

50 kg
14 March

53 kg
14 March

57 kg
14 March

62 kg
14 March

68 kg
14 March

76 kg
14 March

See also 
2021 European Wrestling Olympic Qualification Tournament
2021 African & Oceania Wrestling Olympic Qualification Tournament
2021 Asian Wrestling Olympic Qualification Tournament
2021 World Wrestling Olympic Qualification Tournament
2020 U.S. Olympic Team Trials (wrestling)

References

External links
United World Wrestling

Qualification America
Olympic Q America
Pan American Wrestling Olympic Qualification Tournament
Pan American Wrestling Olympic Qualification Tournament
Pan American Wrestling Olympic Qualification Tournament
International wrestling competitions hosted by Canada
Sports competitions in Ottawa